I Know What You Did Last Summer is a 1997 American slasher film based on the 1973 novel.

I Know What You Did Last Summer may also refer to:

Franchise
I Know What You Did Last Summer (novel), a 1973 suspense novel for young adults by Lois Duncan
I Know What You Did Last Summer (franchise)
I Still Know What You Did Last Summer, a 1998 slasher film and a sequel to the 1997 film
I'll Always Know What You Did Last Summer, a 2006 horror film released straight to DVD and the third installment in the series
I Know What You Did Last Summer (TV series), a 2021 Amazon Prime TV series

Other uses
"I Know What You Did Last Summer" (Supernatural), an episode of the TV series Supernatural
"I Know What You Did Last Summer" (The Vampire Diaries), an episode of the TV series The Vampire Diaries
"I Know What You Did Last Summer" (Scream), an episode of the TV series Scream
"I Know What You Did Last Summer" (song), a 2015 song by Shawn Mendes and Camila Cabello
"I Know What You Did Last Summer", a 2015 song by Jacob Whitesides featuring Kelly Rowland

See also
"I Know What You'll Do Next Summer", a third-season episode of the mystery series Veronica Mars